The District of Opolian Silesia, also designated as the 1st District, was a district that acted as an provisional administrative division of Poland, during the administration of the Provisional Government of the Republic of Poland in 1945, and the Provisional Government of National Unity from 1945 to 1946. It was centered around the area of the Upper Silesia. It was established as one of four provisional districts on 14 March 1945, and existed until 28 June 1946, when it was abolished and incorporated into the Silesian Voivodeship. The head of the district was the attorney-in-fact of the government, Aleksander Zawadzki.

Notes

References 

History of Silesia
History of Opole
Opolian Silesia
Opolian Silesia
1945 establishments in Poland
1946 disestablishments in Poland
Opolian Silesia